In probability theory and related fields, Malliavin calculus is a set of mathematical techniques and ideas that extend the mathematical field of calculus of variations from  deterministic functions to stochastic processes. In particular, it allows the computation of derivatives of random variables. Malliavin calculus is also called the stochastic calculus of variations. P. Malliavin first initiated the calculus on infinite dimensional space. Then, the significant contributors such as S. Kusuoka, D. Stroock, Bismut, S. Watanabe, I. Shigekawa, and so on finally completed the foundations.

Malliavin calculus is named after Paul Malliavin whose ideas led to a proof that Hörmander's condition implies the existence and smoothness of a density for the solution of a stochastic differential equation; Hörmander's original proof was based on the theory of  partial differential equations. The calculus has been applied to stochastic partial differential equations as well.

The calculus allows integration by parts with random variables; this operation is used in mathematical finance to compute the sensitivities of financial derivatives. The calculus has applications in, for example, stochastic filtering.

Overview and history
Malliavin introduced Malliavin calculus to provide a stochastic proof that Hörmander's condition implies the existence of a density for the solution of a stochastic differential equation; Hörmander's original proof was based on the theory of  partial differential equations. His calculus enabled Malliavin to prove regularity bounds for the solution's density. The calculus has been applied to stochastic partial differential equations.

Invariance principle 
The usual invariance principle for Lebesgue integration over the whole real line is that, for any real number ε and integrable function f, the
following holds

 and hence 

This can be used to derive the integration by parts formula since, setting f = gh, it implies

A similar idea can be applied in stochastic analysis for the differentiation along a Cameron-Martin-Girsanov direction. Indeed, let  be a square-integrable predictable process and set

If  is a Wiener process, the Girsanov theorem then yields the following analogue of the invariance principle:

Differentiating with respect to ε on both sides and evaluating at ε=0, one obtains the following integration by parts formula:

Here, the left-hand side is the Malliavin derivative of the random variable  in the direction  and the integral appearing on the right hand side should be interpreted as an Itô integral. This expression also remains true (by definition) if  is not adapted, provided that the right hand side is interpreted as a Skorokhod integral.

Clark–Ocone formula 

One of the most useful results from Malliavin calculus is the Clark–Ocone theorem, which allows the process in the martingale representation theorem to be identified explicitly. A simplified version of this theorem is as follows:

For  satisfying  which is Lipschitz and such that F has a strong derivative kernel, in the sense that

then

where H is the previsible projection of F'(x, (t,1]) which may be viewed as the derivative of the function F with respect to a suitable parallel shift of the process X over the portion (t,1] of its domain.

This may be more concisely expressed by

Much of the work in the formal development of the Malliavin calculus involves extending this result to the largest possible class of functionals F by replacing the derivative kernel used above by the "Malliavin derivative" denoted  in the above statement of the result.

Skorokhod integral 

for F in the domain of the Malliavin derivative, we require

 

where the inner product is that on  viz

 

The existence of this adjoint follows from the Riesz representation theorem for linear operators on Hilbert spaces.

It can be shown that if u is adapted then

 

where the integral is to be understood in the Itô sense.   Thus this provides a method of extending the Itô integral to non adapted integrands.

Applications
The calculus allows integration by parts with random variables; this operation is used in mathematical finance to compute the sensitivities of financial derivatives. The calculus has applications for example in stochastic filtering.

References 
 Kusuoka, S. and Stroock, D. (1981) "Applications of Malliavin Calculus I", Stochastic Analysis, Proceedings Taniguchi International Symposium Katata and Kyoto 1982, pp 271–306
 Kusuoka, S. and Stroock, D. (1985) "Applications of Malliavin Calculus II", J. Faculty Sci. Uni. Tokyo Sect. 1A Math., 32 pp 1–76
 Kusuoka, S. and Stroock, D. (1987) "Applications of Malliavin Calculus III", J. Faculty Sci. Univ. Tokyo Sect. 1A Math., 34 pp 391–442
 Malliavin, Paul and Thalmaier, Anton. Stochastic Calculus of Variations in Mathematical Finance, Springer 2005, 
 
 Bell, Denis. (2007) The Malliavin Calculus, Dover. ; ebook
 Sanz-Solé, Marta (2005) Malliavin Calculus, with applications to stochastic partial differential equations. EPFL Press, distributed by CRC Press, Taylor & Francis Group. 
 Schiller, Alex (2009) Malliavin Calculus for Monte Carlo Simulation with Financial Applications. Thesis, Department of Mathematics, Princeton University
 Øksendal, Bernt K.(1997) An Introduction To Malliavin Calculus With Applications To Economics. Lecture Notes, Dept. of Mathematics, University of Oslo (Zip file containing Thesis and addendum)
Di Nunno, Giulia, Øksendal, Bernt, Proske, Frank (2009) "Malliavin Calculus for Lévy Processes with Applications to Finance", Universitext, Springer.

External links 

  Lecture Notes, 43 pages

  Thesis, 100 pages

Stochastic calculus
Integral calculus
Mathematical finance
Calculus of variations
Paul Malliavin